Mohammad Syafaat Mintaredja (17 February 1921 – 20 October 1984), was an Indonesian politician and government official, who served as the 18th Minister of Social Affairs, from 1971 until 1978. A member and leader of the United Development Party, he served as the party's first chairman, from 1973 until 1978.

Born to a Muhammadiyah family in Bogor, he studied at the Faculty of Law of Gadjah Mada University, in Yogyakarta, and the Law Faculty of Leiden University, Netherlands. He obtained a law degree at the Faculty of Law of the University of Indonesia. As a youth, he was active in the Indonesian Islamic Youth Movement. Together with several others, he founded the Islamic Student Association based in Yogyakarta. He served as general chairman of the HMI Executive Board for the period 1947-1950.

On Saturday, October 20, 1984, Mintaredja died at the age of 63.

References 

1921 births
1984 deaths
Chairmen of the United Development Party
Indonesian expatriates in the Netherlands